Jörg Sobiech (born 15 January 1969) is a German former footballer who played as a defender.

Career
Sobiech was born in Gelsenkirchen and began his career with local side FC Schalke 04. In 1987, he joined SG Wattenscheid 09 with whom he gain promotion to the Bundesliga in 1989–90. In 1993, he joined the Stuttgarter Kickers, but after a year returned to SG Wattenscheid 09. For the 1996–97 season he moved to NEC Nijmegen, with whom he played in the Eredivisie. From March to June 1998, he played on loan with Stoke City in the First Division. He made three appearances for Stoke in 1997–98 before he returned to the Netherlands and played for FC Twente. In 2000, he returned to Germany and played in the 2000–01 season with SV Waldhof Mannheim and then Chemnitzer FC in the 2nd Bundesliga. From 2001 to late 2002, he played again for SG Wattenscheid 09 and then after six months at STV Horst Emscher, Sobiech retired from football in the summer of 2003.

Career statistics

References

1971 births
Living people
German footballers
Association football defenders
SV Waldhof Mannheim players
SG Wattenscheid 09 players
Stuttgarter Kickers players
Chemnitzer FC players
NEC Nijmegen players
FC Twente players
Stoke City F.C. players
STV Horst-Emscher players
Bundesliga players
English Football League players
Eredivisie players
German expatriate footballers
German expatriate sportspeople in the Netherlands
Expatriate footballers in the Netherlands
German expatriate sportspeople in England
Expatriate footballers in England
Sportspeople from Gelsenkirchen
Footballers from North Rhine-Westphalia